The 2007 Uttarakhand Legislative Assembly election were the second Vidhan Sabha (Legislative Assembly) election of the state. The elections were held on 21 February 2007, when the Bharatiya Janata Party emerged as the largest party with 35 seats in the 70-seat legislature. One seat short of forming a majority, the BJP have had to rely on support from the Uttarakhand Kranti Dal and three Independents to form the government. The Indian National Congress became the official opposition, holding 21 seats.

Party position in the Assembly

Key post holders in the Assembly
 Speaker :  Harbans Kapoor
 Deputy Speaker : Vijaya Barthwal (2008–2009)
 Leader of  the House:  Bhuwan Chandra Khanduri (2007–2009)Ramesh Pokhriyal 'Nihsank' (2009–2011)Bhuwan Chandra Khanduri (2011–2012)
 Leader of the Opposition : Harak Singh Rawat
 Chief Secretary : Mahesh Chandra

List of the Second Assembly members

By-elections

See also
 2007 Uttarakhand Legislative Assembly election
 First Khanduri ministry
 Pokhriyal ministry
 Second Khanduri ministry
 Politics of Uttarakhand

Notes
 ‡ – Resigned from office
 # – Elected to the Rajya Sabha

References

Indian politics articles by importance
Uttarakhand Legislative Assembly